F.A.M.E. (backronym of Forgiving All My Enemies) is the fourth studio album by American singer Chris Brown. It was first released on March 18, 2011, recorded by Jive Records. The album serves as the follow-up to his third album Graffiti (2009). The album also marks his last album with Jive Records.

On F.A.M.E., Brown worked with several record producers and songwriters; including Kevin McCall, H Money, Timbaland, The Underdogs, Diplo and Benny Benassi among others. The album features guest appearances, from Lil Wayne, Ludacris, Busta Rhymes, Wiz Khalifa, Game, Justin Bieber and Big Sean, among others. The album was supported by eight singles, "Deuces" featuring Tyga and Kevin McCall, "No BS", "Yeah 3x", "Look at Me Now" featuring Lil Wayne and Busta Rhymes, "Beautiful People" featuring Benny Benassi, "She Ain't You", "Next to You" featuring Justin Bieber, and "Wet the Bed" featuring Ludacris.

The album was worked on simultaneously with the three mixtapes that anticipated it; In My Zone, Fan of a Fan, and In My Zone 2. The album's aesthetics feature a multicolored pop-art graffiti imagery, conceived by Brown himself, Courtney Walter and American contemporary artist Ron English. F.A.M.E. shows a wide variety of musical genres including R&B, pop, hip hop, dancehall, soft rock and Europop, while the lyrical content concentrates on finding positivity in life. The album received mixed reviews from music critics, who generally praised the production, but criticized the content and Brown's performances. The album received three Grammy Award nominations at the 54th Grammy Awards, winning Best R&B Album which was Brown's first Grammy Award. It also won Top R&B Album at the 2012 Billboard Music Awards and Album of the Year at the 2011 Soul Train Music Awards.

F.A.M.E. debuted at number one on the US Billboard 200, with first-week sales of 270,000 copies. It was Brown's first number-one album in the United States and his fourth consecutive top ten album following Graffiti. "Yeah 3x", "Look at Me Now" and "Beautiful People" were commercially successful worldwide. In the United States, "Look at Me Now" reached the number one spot on the Hot R&B/Hip-Hop Songs and Hot Rap Songs charts, and became the best-selling rap song of 2011, as well as one of all-time best-selling singles in the United States. F.A.M.E. is certified triple platinum by the Recording Industry Association of America (RIAA), which makes this Brown's third multi-platinum selling album following Exclusive (2007).To support the release of the album, Brown embarked on his F.A.M.E. Tour in Australia and North America.

Background and recording

Brown's third studio album, Graffiti, was released in December 2009, and was considered to be a critical and commercial failure compared to the singer's previous works, because the singer was in the middle of controversies following his 2009 scandal of domestic violence that had him and his ex-girlfriend Rihanna as protagonists. In 2010, following the release of Graffiti, Brown composed and released 3 free mixtapes: In My Zone (Rhythm & Streets), Fan of a Fan (collaborative mixtape with Tyga), and In My Zone 2, which featured a new style of writing for the singer, facing more grown themes, and having a different musical style, that mixed R&B with hip hop. For the mixtapes he started to work with new producers, most notably Kevin McCall. Meantime, the work for F.A.M.E. started.
                                                                                 
Brown told The Guardian in a 2013 interview that during that period he was having a "troubled time" because he was receiving lots of judgement on his private life. He said that he "felt the hatred from more adult people, and I didn't fully understand it at the time, because I was still going through struggles in my own personal emotional state", but he affirmed that he was sure that working hard would've led him to a comeback, saying that he thought: "I'm going to come back, I know the music that I'm doing, how hard I work, is not just for nothing". He found himself writing several songs every night, "just out of pure… I wouldn't say heartbreak, but just pure ambition. To prove people wrong".
                                                                                                                  
In his 2017 self-documentary, Welcome to My Life, Brown said that the songs that he made were representative of his mental state at the time, that wasn't about focusing on the negative that was going on in his life, but instead he wanted to make records that transcended life and expressed positivity, as much as he was trying to do in his everyday life.

Originally, Brown wanted the album to be a double-disc consistent of 25-30 tracks, but the label was contrary to that, so he cut down the project to 13 tracks for the standard version, extending it to 19 songs in the most expanded deluxe edition of the record. On September 18, 2010, Brown announced the title to the album; F.A.M.E. Brown has mentioned two backronyms of the title: "Forgiving All My Enemies" and "Fans Are My Everything".

Prior to its release the artists that were listed for working with Brown on F.A.M.E. were Kevin McCall, Timbaland, Justin Bieber, Bruno Mars, Wiz Khalifa, Asher Roth and Game. In describing the album, Brown said,

Composition

F.A.M.E. was defined by critics as a "musical kaleidoscope", containing songs of many genres including R&B, pop, hip hop, dancehall, soft rock and Europop. Its sound has been described many times as "colorful" and was complimented for being "very consistent despite its diversity of genres". The lyrical content concentrates on finding positivity in life, through genuineness, romantic love, desire, self-assurance, sex and light-hearted pleasure. F.A.M.E. is considered to be Brown's album that defined his musical style and persona.

Brown's vocal performances on the album mostly exhibit his R&B singing, characterized by harmonization and melisma. Critics commended the singing performances on the album for being "variegated", mostly displaying his natural timbre, but also having sporadic usages of autotune. On the record the singer occasionally raps, marking his first studio album that features this type of performance by Brown.

The opening track, "Deuces", which features Kevin McCall and Tyga, is a slow, downtempo alternative R&B track that starts off the album telling "a bitter male point of view of his failed relationship", where the artists affirm that they moved on to a better moment in their life, reminiscing the pain caused by their past lover. Joanne Dorken of MTV UK noted that the song shows off Brown's "well-harmonized smooth vocals". The following tracks of F.A.M.E. have a more uplifting mood, showcased by lively musical arrangements. "Up 2 You" is an R&B ballad, which follows on from the break-up theme. The song was likened to the musical styles of Bobby Brown and Usher. "Next to You", featuring Justin Bieber, is a "thumping mid-tempo pop&B track". In the song, they both sing about their love for a girl. Sarah Rodman from The Boston Globe wrote that the song "offers one of Brown's most tender vocals to date". The third track, "No Bullshit", is an R&B slow-jam, which features a "classic 90's feel", with an instrumental that combines percussion instruments, piano chords and a tenor flute, talking to a girl whom the singer is about to spend an intimate night.

The album's up-tempo tracks, "Yeah 3x", and the album's last track "Beautiful People", both feature house and Europop influences. "Yeah 3x" was compared to Brown's single "Forever" (2008), and was likened to the musical styles of The Black Eyed Peas, Usher and Jay Sean, while "Beautiful People" was described for its particular progressive house and dancehall influences. Its lyrics encourage a positive view of life. The fourth track, "Look at Me Now", which features American rappers Lil Wayne and Busta Rhymes, is a braggadocious "dirty south" hip hop song, featuring "fast-rapping" from Brown, Lil Wayne and Busta Rhymes. The song was musically compared to Soulja Boy's work and Cali Swag District's "Teach Me How to Dougie" (2010). The fifth track, "She Ain't You", is an R&B ballad that Brown defined as a tribute act to his departed biggest inspiration, Michael Jackson. It samples Jackson's single "Human Nature" (1983) and SWV's "Right Here" (1993). "Should've Kissed You", is a pop&B ballad about the indecision of giving an overthought first kiss to the loved one. The ninth track, "All Back", is a soft rock ballad that features "raw vocals and prominent guitar". It was musically compared to Ryan Tedder's work. Brown revisits his rapping skills on the alternative hip-hop tracks "Say It With Me" and "Oh My Love", that both feature influences from disco in their chouruses, and from rock in their productions. "Bomb", which features Wiz Khalifa, is a dancehall-rap track, and was musically compared to Beenie Man's work. The closing track of the deluxe edition, "Beg for It", is an R&B slow-jam about an exciting sexual encounter, inspired by early works of singer R. Kelly.

Artwork 

The album cover was designed by American contemporary artist Ron English, and it was revealed on February 14, 2011. The cover features a multi-colored, neon portrait of Brown striking a serious pose, while two identical profiles of him wearing a baseball cap and diamond earrings face opposite directions on each shoulder. Its background is composed by very numerous posters, captioned by the words "Forgiving All My Enemies", that show many figures, including Brown in a stone faced pose, and a child wearing a combat helmet branded with the peace symbol (☮). The album's esthetic direction was handled by Brown himself, Courtney Walter and Ron English. Its aesthetics feature a multicolored pop-art graffiti imagery.

Release and promotion
The standard edition of the album was released simultaneously with the deluxe edition from March 18, 2011. The deluxe edition included five additional tracks. The official track listing for the album was revealed on February 22, 2011.

To promote the album, Brown performed "Yeah 3x" and "No Bullshit" on Saturday Night Live on February 12, 2011. During the week leading up to the US release of the album, Brown treated fans to a series of secret listening sessions, and gave them an exclusive bonus track and music video. It was a campaign that Brown launched on behalf of his worldwide fan base, nicknamed "Team Breezy". The first listening session was held on March 14 in Los Angeles. It was then followed by consecutive sessions in Atlanta (March 15), Washington, D.C. (March 16) and New York City (March 17). Each session was held at a secret location and was hosted by Brown and the "Team Breezy" team leaders in each city.

On March 22, 2011, Brown appeared on Good Morning America to perform "Yeah 3x", and later appeared on 106 & Park, where he performed "Deuces", "Look at Me Now" and "Ain't Thinkin' 'Bout You". His Good Morning America appearance sparked controversial headlines because, following his interview with Robin Roberts at the Times Square Studios, where he was repeatedly asked about the Rihanna situation and restraining order, Brown started crying and became violent in his dressing room during a commercial break before his, later cancelled, second performance ending that day's program, and broke a window overlooking Times Square punching it. Following the incident, he apologized, saying that he was very tired of people bringing up the incident.

On March 29, 2011, a pre-taped performance of Brown performing "Yeah 3x" and a medley of "Forever" and "Beautiful People", was broadcast on Dancing with the Stars (US). On June 26, 2011, he performed "She Ain't You", "Look at Me Now" and "Paper, Scissors, Rock" live at the 2011 BET Awards. On July 15, 2011, Brown appeared on The Today Show, as part of the show's concert series, which took place at the Rockefeller Plaza in New York City. Brown performed "Yeah 3x", "I Can Transform Ya", "She Ain't You" and "Forever" at the concert. On August 28, 2011, Brown did a medley of "Yeah 3x", "Protect Ya Neck", "Smells Like Teen Spirit" and "Beautiful People" at the 2011 MTV Video Music Awards, performing a highly acclaimed choreography that included flying parts.

Singles
"Yeah 3x" was released as the album's lead single on October 25, 2010. It received positive reviews from critics, who praised its production and lyrics. The song peaked at number 15 on the US Billboard Hot 100, and number 12 on the Canadian Hot 100. It reached the top-ten on the singles charts of Australia, Austria, Denmark, Germany, Ireland, Netherlands, New Zealand, Switzerland and the United Kingdom. 
        
"Look at Me Now", which features American rappers Lil Wayne and Busta Rhymes, was released as the album's second single on February 1, 2011. It was sent to rhythmic contemporary radio in the United States on February 8, 2011. Music critics noted "Look at Me Now" as the standout track on the album, and praised Busta Rhymes and Lil Wayne's rap verses. The song peaked at number six on the US Billboard Hot 100 chart, making it Brown's highest chart position since "Forever" (2008). It reached number one on the US Rap Songs and Hot R&B/Hip-Hop Songs charts.
   
"Beautiful People", featuring Benny Benassi, was released as the album's third single on March 11, 2011. The song was well received by most music critics who praised its production and lyrics. "Beautiful People" reached the top-ten in Australia, Ireland, New Zealand and the United Kingdom. In the United States, the song peaked at number one on the Billboard Hot Dance Club Songs chart, and became the first number-one single for both Brown and Benassi. "She Ain't You" was released to urban radio in the United States on March 28, 2011, as the fourth US single from F.A.M.E.. It peaked at number five on the US Hot R&B/Hip-Hop Songs chart, number 17 on the US Pop Songs chart, and number 27 on the US Billboard Hot 100 chart.

"Next to You", which features Canadian recording artist Justin Bieber, was released as the fourth international single on June 24, 2011. Most music critics positively reviewed the song, complimenting the blending of Brown and Bieber's vocals. The song reached the top-twenty in Austria, New Zealand and the United Kingdom, and the top-thirty in Australia, Germany, Ireland and the United States.

"Wet the Bed", which features American rapper Ludacris, was sent to US urban radio on September 13, 2011, as the album's fifth US single. It peaked at number six on the US Hot R&B/Hip-Hop Songs chart and number 77 on the US Billboard Hot 100 chart.

Tour

Brown embarked on his F.A.M.E. Tour in April 2011 in Australia. Jessica Mauboy, Havana Brown, and Justice Crew, served as the supporting acts on all dates of the Australian leg. 32 show dates in North America were later added to the tour, which began in September 2011. Kelly Rowland, T-Pain, Bow Wow and Tyga served as the opening acts of the North American leg.

Critical reception

F.A.M.E. received mixed reviews from music critics according to review aggregator Metacritic, which gave the album a weighted average score of 52 out of 100 based on 16 reviews, indicating "mixed or average reviews".

Bred Wete of Entertainment Weekly gave the album a B+, and praised the album in comparisons to Brown's other work, saying: "F.A.M.E. shines brighter than anything he produced before that now-infamous incident. Melodic raps on tracks like "Say It With Me" and "Oh My Love" lead to intoxicating hooks, as do bedroom knockers "Wet the Bed" and "No Bullshit," which for better (or worse) rival the bump-'n'-grind heights of '90s Casanova crew Jodeci.", and that, "On its own merits, F.A.M.E. deserves to be heard.". Andy Kellman of AllMusic agreed, stating after his praises of the album that, "This all makes F.A.M.E. the equal of Forever, if not slightly better, and it hints that Brown's best is yet to come." and gave the album 3.5 out of 5 stars. Jody Rosen of Rolling Stone gave the album a positive 3 out of 5 stars, praised the album's appeal, and said that "F.A.M.E. is a pop 'n' b album with something for everyone."

Other reviewers were less generous. Margert Wappler of the Los Angeles Times gave it 2.5 out of 4 stars, and while she felt the album was done "capably" and that Brown had pulled of some "neat coups", that she felt that, "F.A.M.E. also feels strained and sometimes downright desperate.". Evan Rytlewski of The A.V. Club, gave the album an average "C" rating, feeling that while "Brown [made] a solid case for himself as an adult artist.", he also argued that the album "inevitably falls flat, though, when he tries to reclaim his teen-idol mantle on oversold ballads." Joe Caramanica of The New York Times gave the album 2 stars out of 5 and compared the album to Brown's contemporaries, saying that "Mr. Brown sings, with a modicum of angst [on "Up To You"]. But for much of this album—almost the whole second half, actually—Mr. Brown is chasing Usher with a ferocity out onto the dance floor, where no one will pay much mind to his words." Eric Henderson of Slant Magazine felt divided by the album, arguing that "...his album isn't really much of anything other than a collection of avoidant club jams (the spin class-ready "Yeah 3x") and indirect overtures of love/lust (the passive-unaggressive "Up 2 You" and "She Ain't You," which matches carbon-copy sentiment by recycling SWV's sample of Michael Jackson's "Human Nature")." and that, "At worst, the album's pheromones come on like a spoonful of R. Kelly's discolored jelly, as in the drool pool "Wet the Bed." Bad enough to open with "I ain't afraid to drown if that means I'm deep up in your ocean/Girl, I'll drink you down, sipping on your body all night," but letting Ludacris boast "Women call me the Super Soaker and Ima soak your bed to death" as the moist backbeat ejaculates all over is like some new form of jizz torture."

Some reviewers even argued that the album wasn't worth listening to at all. David Amidon of Pop Matters gave the album a 3 out of 10 in scathing review, and ended the review off with "F.A.M.E. will satisfy 12 year Malibu and Miami beach frequenters, but anyone with a soul should steer far clear of this mess.". Joe Rivers of No Ripcord went as far as to say that, "F.A.M.E. is a vile, despicable album that doesn't deserve to be supported in any way, shape or form. Its very existence is a frightening indictment of our times, in terms of our attitudes to music, women and the cult of celebrity." and gave the album an incredibly rare 0 out of 10.

Accolades
Brown received six nominations at the 2011 BET Awards and ultimately won five awards, including Best Male R&B Artist, Viewers Choice Award, The Fandemonium Award, Best Collaboration and Video of the Year for "Look at Me Now". He also won three awards the 2011 BET Hip Hop Awards, including the People's Champ Award, Reese's Perfect Combo Award and Best Hip Hop Video for "Look at Me Now". F.A.M.E. was nominated for Favorite Soul/R&B Album at the 2011 American Music Awards. On November 27, 2011, it won Album of the Year at the 2011 Soul Train Music Awards. The album and its single, "Look at Me Now", earned Brown three nominations at the 54th Grammy Awards, including Best R&B Album, Best Rap Performance and Best Rap Song. F.A.M.E. eventually won in the Best R&B Album category. At the 2012 NAACP Image Awards, the album was nominated in the Outstanding Album category. F.A.M.E. was nominated and later won in the Top R&B Album category of the 2012 Billboard Music Awards.

Commercial performance
F.A.M.E. debuted at number one on the US Billboard 200, with first-week sales of 270,000 copies, serving as Brown's first number-one album on the chart. Its first week sales also served as the second-largest one-week sales of 2011 in the United States alone. On the Top R&B/Hip-Hop Albums chart, F.A.M.E. also debuted at number one, giving Brown his third non-consecutive number-one album on the chart. As of May 2012, F.A.M.E. has sold 872,000 copies in the United States. In October 2021, the album was certified triple platinum by the Recording Industry Association of America (RIAA), for combined album sales and album-equivalent units of over three million units in the United States.

Track listing

Notes

 "Up to You" is titled as "Up 2 You" on the iTunes version of the album.
 "No Bullshit", which features Kevin McCall, is sometimes titled "No BS".
 "Yeah 3x" is stylized as "Yeah 3X" on the iTunes version of the album.
 "Next to You", which features Justin Bieber, is written as "Next 2 You" on the iTunes version of the album.
 "Bomb", which features Wiz Khalifa, was on the same version of the standard edition of the album, for a limited time only.

Sample credits
 "She Ain't You" contains portions of the recording "Right Here (Human Nature Radio Mix)" by SWV; and a sample of the recording "Human Nature" by Michael Jackson.
 "Yeah 3x", contains elements of the recording "I'm Not Alone" by Calvin Harris.
 "Bomb" contains a sample of the recording "Bam Bam" by Sister Nancy.

Personnel
Credits for F.A.M.E. adapted from Allmusic.

 Afrojack – producer
 Nasri Atweh – producer
 Derrick "Bigg D" Baker – producer
 Mark Beaven – assistant
 Alessandro "Alle" Benassi – producer
 Marco "Benny" Benassi – producer
 Timothy Bloom – producer
 David Boyd – assistant
 Chris Brown – creative director, executive producer, producer
 Kweli Calderon – grooming
 Kenneth Cappello – photography
 Antwoine "T-Wiz" Collins – producer
 Michael Congdon – assistant, engineer
 Tom Coyne – mastering
 Michael Daley – assistant
 Tina Davis – executive producer
 Diplo – producer
 Lamar Edwards – keyboards
 Ron English – cover painting
 Dustin Faltz – assistant
 Iain Findlay – assistant
 Justin Franks – producer
 Free School – producer
 Jesus Garnica – assistant
 Serban Ghenea – mixing
 Dabling Harward – engineer
 Justin Henderson – producer
 Andrew Hey – engineer
 Ghazi Hourani – assistant
 Jaycen Joshua – mixing
 Marcus Johnson – assistant
 K Mac – producer
 Ryan Kelly – assistant
 Brian Kennedy – producer
 Mike Layos – assistant
 Lonnie-Smoek-Stinson – grooming
 Justin Merrill – assistant
 Adam Messinger – producer
 The Messingers – producer
 Mark Pitts – executive producer
 Harmony Samuels – producer
 Brian Springer – engineer, mixing
 Brian Stanley – mixing
 Amber Streeter – background vocals
 Anthony Taglianetti – assistant
 Team Breezy – art direction, creative director, design, executive producer, stylist
 Tha Bizness – producer
 David Thomas – stylist
 The Underdogs – producer
 Courtney Walter – art direction, creative director, design
 Christopher Whitacre – producer

Charts

Weekly charts

Year-end charts

Certifications

Release history

References

External links
 
 F.A.M.E. at Metacritic

2011 albums
Chris Brown albums
Jive Records albums
Grammy Award for Best R&B Album
Albums produced by Brian Kennedy (record producer)
Albums produced by Diplo
Albums produced by DJ Frank E
Albums produced by Free School
Albums produced by Harmony Samuels
Albums produced by Jerome "J-Roc" Harmon
Albums produced by Polow da Don
Albums produced by Tha Bizness
Albums produced by the Messengers (producers)
Albums produced by the Underdogs (production team)
Albums produced by Timbaland
Albums recorded at Westlake Recording Studios